Nirvana Gounden, MEd,  attended the University of KwaZulu-Natal,(born 1984) is a South African educational app creator, author and teacher of mathematics.  She specializes in mathematics education, and holds a master's degree in education, Bachelor of Science degree in biological sciences and an advanced certificate in education mathematics.

Education
Gounden attended college at the University of KwaZulu-Natal (UKZN) and the University of South Africa at  University of South Africa  in Durban, South Africa, where she received her undergraduate and postgraduate degrees, including a master's degree in education. She had worked as a mathematics and science teacher for eight years at The Department of Education in Durban, South Africa.

Career and publications
During her career, Gounden has taught science and mathematics at secondary school level from grades 8 to 12 and has authored and published the smartphone interactive Mathematics Workbooks I DO U DO MATHS in 2017. The books are divided into two, with Book 1 covering algebra (grades 8 to 12), calculus (grade 12) and  number patterns (grades 8 to 12), and Book 2 covering trigonometry (grades 10 to 12), geometry (grades 8 to 12) and functions (grades 8 to 12). During the COVID-19 coronavirus pandemic, Gounden created free online mathematics interactive timetables for grade 8 to 12 learners.

References

External links
  Gounden’s official website

Living people
1984 births
Education writers
University of KwaZulu-Natal alumni